Pygmaepterys cracentis is a species of sea snail, a marine gastropod mollusk in the family Muricidae, the murex snails or rock snails.

Description

Distribution
This marine species occurs off the Moluccas, Indonesia.

References

External links
 Houart R. (1996). Results of the Rumphius Biohistorical Expedition to Ambon (1990). Part 5. Mollusca, Gastropoda, Muricidae. Zoologische Mededelingen. 70(26): 377-397.

Pygmaepterys
Gastropods described in 1996